Dizar (also Romanized as Dīzār, Dījār, and Dehzār) is a village in Jafarabad Rural District, Jafarabad District, Qom County, Qom Province, Iran. At the 2006 census, its population was 30, in 7 families.

One of big and important  families are for Mr Khodada خداداد zand.

حاج موسی خان زند دیزاری اولین کسی بود که بنای روستای دیزار را نهاد و هم اکنون نیز فرزندان او ساکن این روستا هستند.به طور کلی این روستا همگی فامیل بوده و خانواده حاج خداداد و حاج علی داد زند و یا از بستگان انها هستند.

References 

Populated places in Qom Province